Yeh Ching-chuan (born 29 June 1950) is a Taiwanese politician.

Education
Upon graduation from National Taiwan University medical school, Yeh began studying for his master's degree in public health. He then obtained an MPH in epidemiology from Harvard School of Public Health in 1981.

Political career
Yeh served as deputy mayor of Taipei under Ma Ying-jeou, and was named a deputy secretary general of the presidential office at the start of Ma's first presidential term in 2008. He later replaced Lin Fang-yue as health minister in September 2008. In May 2009, the 2009 flu pandemic reached Taiwan. Before it abated, Yeh resigned his position on 3 August to run for the Hualien County magistracy, but lost a primary to Tu Li-hua.

In 2014, he was selected to lead a committee that explored possible changes to the National Health Insurance program. Yeh later chaired the Taiwan Blood Services Foundation, resigning the position in 2017.

References

1950 births
Living people
Deputy mayors of Taipei
Kuomintang politicians in Taiwan
Taiwanese Ministers of Health and Welfare
Harvard School of Public Health alumni
National Taiwan University alumni